Polythecophyton was a genus of Early Devonian aneurophyte with branching axes, drooping, many-branched sporangia, but no trace of a vascular system. It grew to several centimetres in length, and its axes were almost a centimeter across.

References 

Early Devonian plants
Pragian life
Prehistoric plant genera